Strike Ten is the eighth album by German heavy metal band Bonfire, but the tenth album release, hence the name. It was released in 2001 by BMG International and features a bonus song that was cut from the Fireworks album called "Angel in White", which was also a B-side to the single "Sleeping All Alone".

Track listing

Bonus track
 Take Me By the Hand (4:07)

Band members
Claus Lessmann - lead & backing vocals, acoustic guitar
Hans Ziller - lead, rhythm & acoustic guitars, backing vocals, talk box
Chris Lausmann - rhythm guitar, keyboards, backing vocals
Uwe Köhler - bass, backing vocals
Jürgen Wiehler - drums, backing vocals

Reception
Metal Reviews said, "This new album is for all the fans who love good old Hard-Rock with good riffs and solos, great vocals and who like me love to headbang crazy while you drive."

References

External links
 Billboard's listing of Strike Ten

Bonfire (band) albums
2001 albums